Abū Alī Muḥammad ibn al-Mustanīr, known as Quṭrub the Grammarian of al-Baṣrah, was a poet, a scientist, a scholar of Qur'anic exegesis (tafsir) and the leading philologist and linguist of his time.  He wrote on a wide field of subjects and authored the first Kitāb al-Muthalath ('Ternary'), of which several later and extended versions were produced.  He died in 821/22 (206 AH).

Life
Quṭrub  the Grammarian, Abū ‘Alī Muḥammad ibn al-Mustanīr, known also as Aḥmad ibn Muḥammad, or al-Ḥasan ibn Muḥammad; he studied under Sibawayh and the Baṣran philologists, rivals of the Kūfah school. Quṭrub, and later his son al-Ḥasan, taught the sons of Abū Dulaf al-Qāsim ibn Īsā.

Quṭrub was a native of Baṣrah and a mawlā (apprentice) of Salīm ibn Ziād. The polymath Muḥammad ibn Ḥabīb (d.859/860)  quoted Quṭrub along with Ibn al-A‘rābī, Abū ‘Ubaydah, Abū al-Yaqẓān, et al, who were among the scholars of genealogy, historical tradition, language, poetry and the tribes.  The ḥāfiẓ  of Baghdād Hārūn Ibn ‘Alī al-Munajjim, of the famous Munajjim family, included verses by Quṭrub in his Kitāb al-Bārī.

Works
Among his written books were:
 Ma’ānī al-Qur’ān ‘Meaning of the Qur’ān’; (rhetorical figures of the Qur’ān) 
 Kitāb al-Ishtiqāq 'Derivations' (Etymology);
 Kitāb al-Qawāfī (treatise on Rhymes);
 Kitāb al-Nawādir 'Rare Forms' (book of anecdotes);
 Kitāb al-Azmina 'Periods' (Seasons);
 Kitāb al-Muthalath  The Ternary ‘Triple’;
 Kitāb al-Farq 'Distinguishing' (anthropological and zoological anatomical terms);
 Kitāb al-Aswāt 'Voices' (Interjections);
 Kitāb al-Sifāt 'Epithets' (Adjectives, Attributes);
 Kitāb al-‘Ilal fī al-Nahwī 'The Weak Letters in Grammar';
 Kitāb al-Adhdād 'Antonyms';
 Kitāb al-Khulq al-Faras 'Nature of the Horse';
 Kitāb al-Khulq al-Insān 'Nature of Man';
 Kitāb al-Khulq Gharīb al-Ḥadīth 'Rare Expressions in the Ḥadīth';
 Kitāb al-Radd ‘alā ‘l-Mulhidīn fī Mutashābu ‘l-Qur’ān 'Refutation of the Heretics, about the metaphorical (anthropomorphic) interpretations in the Qur’ān';
 Kitāb al-Hamza 'The Letter Hamza';
 Kitāb al-Fa‘ala wa-Af‘ala 'Verbs in First and Fourth Class';
 Kitāb I’rāb al-Qur’ān  'Inflection (Declension) of the Qur’ān'. 
 Kitāb fī al-Anwā’ 'Al-Anwā’'

Bibliography

See also

List of Arab scientists and scholars
Encyclopædia Britannica Online

Notes

References

821 deaths
Grammarians of Basra
9th-century linguists
9th-century philologists
9th-century scientists
9th-century writers
9th-century zoologists
Scholars from the Abbasid Caliphate